The Bloch MB.120 was a French three-engine colonial transport aircraft built by Société des Avions Marcel Bloch during the 1930s.

Design and development
The MB.120 design was selected by the French government for transport use in French overseas territories. It was an all-metal high-wing cantilever monoplane. The prototype was re-worked from the MB.71. Standard accommodation was for a crew of three and up to 10 passengers. The civil aircraft normally carried only four passengers, the rest of the aircraft was filled with mail. Ten production aircraft were produced, six for civil use and four for the French Air Force.

Operational history
The aircraft entered operation in 1934 for Air Afrique, which was a new airline set up by the French government on 11 May 1934 to provide service between the French African territories. Both the civil and military aircraft served only in French Africa.

Variants
MB.120.01 : First prototype.
MB.120 : Three-engined colonial transport aircraft. Ten built.

Operators

Air Afrique
French Air Force

Specifications (M.B.120)

See also

References

Bibliography

MB.120
1930s French airliners
1930s French military transport aircraft
Trimotors
High-wing aircraft
Aircraft first flown in 1932